Philippe Perrin (born 10 August 1964) is a French contemporary sculptor and photographer who lives and works in Paris. His works are in the collections of the Maison Européenne de la Photographie in Paris and the Musée d'art contemporain de Lyon.

Biography 
Philippe Perrin was born in 1964 in La Tronche. Graduate of the École supérieure d'art de Grenoble, his work has been the subject of many gallery and museum shows, including his retrospective at the Maison Européene de la Photographie, at the Fondation Maeght, as well being sold in public auction, including the work 'Couteau' sold by Sotheby's Paris in the sale 'The Secret Garden of Marianne and Pierre Nahon' in 2004.

Work 
Since the 1980s, Philippe Perrin has been an unconventional figure on the international art scene, known for his short temper and bad-boy image, exploring the inter merging of reality and fiction, evoking in his work symbols of violence taken from a variety of genres, such as crime fiction, cinema, or popular culture, notably he pays with the question of scale of the object, such as the revolver or a razor blade.

His fascination with fictional characters or symbols of the underworld : the gram of coke becomes a kilogram, or a razor blade, a revolver and other symbols of violence are presented on a large scale. For the French art critic Nicolas Bourriaud, "Perrin is a manipulator of signs, interpreting the relationship between reality and fiction through a question of scale, treating in the same manner the relation between a true biography and that of the figure of a celebrity."

A work representative of Perrin's language of allegory-visual suggestion his "Skyline": seven ball cartridges of variable sizes respect the measures of the space where they are inserted, forming a front: first line of a fighting army or a skyscrapers seafront.

"All art is political. Then we must not confuse political artists whose only goal is to seize power at any price, including mediocrity, with political artists who are supposed to "say" things…" Philippe Perrin

Exhibitions

Main solo shows 
 2020 : "PHILIPPE PERRIN". L’Approche. Molenbeek –Bruxelles. 
 2019 : "WELCOME TO BANYULS". Musée Maillol, Banyuls, France 
 2018 : "SHOT BY BOTH SIDES". 59pm. Bruxelles 
 2017 : "SULFURES". Incognito Artclub. Paris  
 2014 : " Kung Foo Cowboy ", Incognito Artclub, Paris.
 2013 : " Kill Me ", Recreation of the 1993 performance, Musée de la Chasse et de la Nature, Paris.
 2012 : " Under the gun ", Musée Maillol, Paris, France.
 2010 : " Haut et Court ", Maison européenne de la photographie, Paris, France.
 2009 : " Philippe Perrin ", Gallery Albert Benamou, Paris, France.
 2009 : " Agrandissements ", Gallery Maeght, Paris, France.
 2006 : " Heaven ", monumental installation for the Nuit Blanche.
 2006 : " Shootingstar ", Xin Dong Cheng Gallery, Beijing, China.
 2004 : " Philippe Perrin Superstar ", Guy Pieters Gallery, Knokke, Belgique
 2001 : " Poupestroy ", Gallery R&L Beaubourg, Paris, France.
 1997 : " Les Mystères de Paris ", Maison européenne de la photographie, Paris, France.
 1997 : " Rendez-vous au ciel ", Gallery R&L Beaubourg, Paris, France.
 1989 : " La Panoplie ", Philippe Perrin at the Galerie Perrotin, Paris, France.

Main group shows 
 2019 : « LA VIE EST UN FILM ». Curated by Ben Vautier. Le 109. Nice
 2019 : « LIBERTE, LIBERTE CHERIE ». Ancien bagne. Nice
 2019 : « ARTA ». Saisons croisées. Bucarest
 2019 : « PORTE ENTROUVERTE ». Freeport. Luxembourg.
 2019 : « ARTA ». Saisons croisées. Grenoble.
 2018 : « L’ESPRIT D’UNE COLLECTION ». Fondation Maeght. St-Paul de Vence. F
 2018 : « LA PHOTOGRAPHIE FRANCAISE EXISTE, JE L’AI RENCONTREE ». Maison Européenne de la Photographie. MEP. Paris
 2018 : " CRUE 1910". Incognito Artclub. Paris
 2017 : "LA TEMPETE". CRAC, Sète. France
 2017 :"VARIATIONS". Cité Internationale des Arts, Paris
 2016 :  "M.Y. Foundation" Collection. Musée Olympique. Séoul. Korea 
 2016 : "LES INVENDUS". Collection Albert Benamou. Musée Le Carroi et Hôtel de Ville. Chinon. France 
 2015 : " Chercher le garçon ", Contemporary art museum of Val-de-Marne
 2014 : « Les Invendus », Albert Benamou Collection, Museum of Le Carroi and Hôtel de Ville.
 2014 : " Invasao criativa ", Cidade Matarazzo, São Paulo, Brazil.
 2013 : " Maison européenne de la photographie ", Paris, France.
 2013 : " L'Œil d'un collectionneur ": Serge Aboukrat, Maison européenne de la photographie, Paris.
 2012 : " Cibles ", Musée de la Chasse et de la Nature, Paris.
 2012 : Marlborough Gallery, Monaco (artist group show including Picasso, Miguel Chevalier, François Morellet, Chu Teh-Chun etc.).
 2012 : " Group show ", Galerie Maeght, Paris.
 2012 :  " Biennale de La Havane ", Cuba, (11th edition).
 2012 : " 50 artists, one collection ", Fondation Maeght, Saint-Paul de Vence, France.
 2006 : " Sculptures en plein air ", Xin Dong Cheng Gallery, Beijing.
 2005 : " Autour de la photographie ", Maison européenne de la photographie, Paris.
 1996 : " La Colère ", The Pompidou Centre, Paris.
 1995 : " Passions privées ", Musée d'art moderne de la ville de Paris, Paris.
 1994 : " Hors limites ", The Pompidou Centre, Paris.
 1993 : " Krieg (guerre) ", Triennale of photography, Graz.
 1992 : " Ligne de mire ", Fondation Cartier pour l'art contemporain.

Publications 
 2010 : Always the Sun, "Catalogue déraisonné 1986 – 2010", Texts by Nicolas Bourriaud et Jean Nouvel

References

External links 
 Official Website
  Philippe Perrin retrospective at the MEP
 Philippe Perrin in Centre Pompidou
 Philippe Perrin on Artnet

1964 births
Living people
French photographers
People from La Tronche